The Nightbirds of London is a 1915 British silent crime film directed by Frank Wilson and starring Stewart Rome, Chrissie White and Violet Hopson. It was based on a play by George R. Sims.

Cast
 Stewart Rome 
 Chrissie White 
 Violet Hopson 
 Lionelle Howard 
 William Felton 
 John MacAndrews 
 Henry Vibart 
 Arthur Staples

References

Bibliography
 Palmer, Scott. British Film Actors' Credits, 1895-1987. McFarland, 1988.

External links

1915 films
1915 crime films
British crime films
British silent feature films
Films directed by Frank Wilson
Films set in London
British films based on plays
British black-and-white films
Hepworth Pictures films
1910s English-language films
1910s British films